Lishe International Airport Station is an underground metro station in Ningbo, Zhejiang, China. Lishe International Airport Station is a terminal station of Line 2, Ningbo Rail Transit. It situates on the south of planned Terminal 2 of Ningbo Lishe International Airport. Construction of the station starts in December 2010 and opened to service in September 26, 2015.

Exits 

Lishe International Airport Station has 3 exits.

References 

Railway stations in Zhejiang
Railway stations in China opened in 2015
Ningbo Rail Transit stations